Eugene Lewis Freese (January 8, 1934 – June 18, 2013), was an American professional baseball  third baseman, who was widely noted as a journeyman. Freese played in Major League Baseball for the Pittsburgh Pirates (twice), St. Louis Cardinals, Philadelphia Phillies, Chicago White Sox (twice), Cincinnati Reds, and Houston Astros, for 12 seasons (–).

Freese's career batting average stands at .254, in 1,115 games played, with 115 home runs and 432 runs batted in (RBI).

Early life

Freese was a native of Wheeling, West Virginia. He signed with the Pirates in 1953 and played for 17 seasons in professional baseball.

Baseball career

Freese was a member of the  National League (NL) champion Reds. Acquired in an off-season interleague deal with the White Sox, he reached career highs in home runs (26), RBI (87) and games played (152 – 151 of which were at third base), as Cincinnati won its first pennant since . In the 1961 World Series, won by the New York Yankees in five games, Freese batted only .063 (1-for-16) and was the victim of one of two spectacular defensive plays by his third-base counterpart, Clete Boyer, in the Series opener.

The following year, Freese broke an ankle during a spring training intrasquad game and missed almost the entire  season. He never regained his 1961 form, although he stayed in MLB through 1966. Freese's 877 major league hits included 161 doubles, 28 triples and 115 home runs.

Freese died on June 18, 2013, in Metairie, Louisiana. His older brother, George, briefly played Major League Baseball and was a longtime scout and Minor League Baseball (MiLB) manager.

References

External links

Gene Freese at Astros Daily

1934 births
2013 deaths
Baseball players from West Virginia
Brunswick Pirates players
Buffalo Bisons (minor league) players
Burlington-Graham Pirates players
Chicago White Sox players
Cincinnati Reds players
Hawaii Islanders players
Hollywood Stars players
Houston Astros players
Major League Baseball third basemen
Minor league baseball managers
New Orleans Pelicans (baseball) players
Philadelphia Phillies players
Pittsburgh Pirates players
St. Louis Cardinals players
San Diego Padres (minor league) players
Shreveport Captains players
Sportspeople from Wheeling, West Virginia
Tacoma Cubs players